Sturt is a suburb of Adelaide in the City of Marion local government area.  It was named after the explorer Captain Charles Sturt.

Sturt is in the South Australian House of Assembly electoral district of Gibson and the Australian House of Representatives Division of Boothby.

History
The first Sturt Post Office opened on 11 October 1849 and closed in 1969. A Darlington South office opened in 1953; it was renamed Sturt South in 1966 and Sturt in 1985.

References

See also
 List of Adelaide suburbs

Suburbs of Adelaide
Charles Sturt